Keith Waldrop (born December 11, 1932, in Emporia, Kansas) is an American poet, translator, and academic. He has authored numerous books of poetry and prose and translated the work of Claude Royet-Journoud, Anne-Marie Albiach, and Edmond Jabès, among others. One such translation is Charles Baudelaire's Les Fleurs du Mal (2006). He won the National Book Award for Poetry for his 2009 collection Transcendental Studies: A Trilogy.

Personal life
Waldrop started his education at Kansas State Teachers College, studying to be a doctor. However, in 1953, he was drafted into the United States Army and stationed in West Germany, where he met his wife Rosmarie Waldrop.

Career
Waldrop received his Ph.D. in comparative literature from the University of Michigan in 1964 and four years later began teaching at Brown University (1968).

With Rosmarie Waldrop, he co-edits Burning Deck Press. He lives in Providence, Rhode Island, and became a professor emeritus at Brown in 2011. The French government has named him Chevalier des arts et des lettres.

Awards and honors
Chevalier des arts et des lettres by the French government.
2009 National Book Award for Poetry for Transcendental Studies: A Trilogy.
2014 Best Translated Book Award, Poetry, one of two runners-up for Four Elemental Bodies by Claude Royet-Journoud, translated from the French.

Selected works

Poetry

 A Windmill Near Calvary (University of Michigan Press, 1968)
 The Garden of Effort (Burning Deck, 1975)
 Shipwreck In Haven (Awede, 1989)
 The Opposite of Letting the Mind Wander (Lost Roads, 1990)
 The Locality Principle (Avec, 1995)
 Analogies of Escape (Burning Deck, 1997)
 The Silhouette of the Bridge (Memory Stand-Ins) (Avec, 1997)
 Stone Angels (Instress, 1997)
 Well Well Reality (Collaborations with Rosmarie Waldrop) (The Post-Apollo Press, 1998)
 Haunt (Instance, 2000)
 Semiramis If I Remember (Avec, 2001)
 The House Seen from Nowhere (Litmus Press, 2003)
 The Real Subject: queries and Conjectures of Jacob Delafon, with Sample Poems (Omnidawn Publishing, 2005)
 Several Gravities (Siglio, 2009)
 Transcendental Studies: A Trilogy (University of California Press, 2009) —winner of the National Book Award
 The Space of Half an Hour  (Burning Deck, 1983)
 The Not Forever [Inventions]  (Omnidawn, 2013)
 Selected Poems  (Omnidawn, 2016)

Prose

 Hegel's Family (Station Hill, 1989)
 Light While There is Light (Sun & Moon, 1993)

Visual Art

 Several Gravities (Siglio Press, 2009)

Translations

The Flowers of Evil by Charles Baudelaire (Wesleyan, 2006)
 Figured Image by Anne-Marie Albiach (The Post-Apollo Press, 2006)
 The Form of a City Changes Faster, Alas, Than the Human Heart by Jacques Roubaud (tr. with Rosmarie Waldrop) (Dalkey Archive, 2006)
 Theory of Prepositions by Claude Royet-Journoud (Fence, 2006)
 L’état des métamorphoses by Tita Reut with Patricia Erbelding (Art inprogress, 2005)
 Another Kind of Tenderness by Xue Di with Forrest Gander (Litmus, 2004)
 Close Quote by Marie Borel (Burning Deck, 2003) 
 Mental Ground by Esther Tellermann (Burning Deck, 2002)
 The Selected Poems of Edmond Jabes (Station Hill Press, 1988)
 The notion of obstacle by Claude Royet-Journoud (Awede, 1985)

References

External links
Exhibit at the Academy of American Poets includes links to some poems by Keith Waldrop including "Invitation to the Voyage", "Light Travels", "Posthumous Remorse Whir"
Keith Waldrop Page at the Electronic Poetry Center extensive links to bibliography, biography, essays, reviews, etc.
On Collage: from an interview with Keith Waldrop conducted by Peter Gizzi
On the Art of Keith Waldrop by Robert Seydel (excerpt)
An essay on Waldrop's Light While There Is Light by poet and novelist Ben Lerner
The National Book Foundation interview with Keith Waldrop conducted by Craig Morgan Teicher

Living people
1932 births
Poets from Kansas
American book publishers (people)
University of Michigan College of Literature, Science, and the Arts alumni
People from Emporia, Kansas
National Book Award winners
Brown University alumni